The Bortura (also: Bârsău) is a left tributary of the river Someș in Romania. It discharges into the Someș in Fărcașa.

References

Rivers of Romania
Rivers of Satu Mare County
Rivers of Maramureș County